Bátorová is a village and municipality in the Veľký Krtíš District of the Banská Bystrica Region of southern Slovakia.

History
The village was first mentioned in 1478 (Bathor). It belonged to landowners Balogh, Koháry and Kubinyi. From 1938 to 1944 it belonged to Hungary.

Genealogical resources

The records for genealogical research are available at the state archive "Statny Archiv in Banska Bystrica,  Slovakia"

 Roman Catholic church records (births/marriages/deaths): 1699-1897 (parish B)
 Lutheran church records (births/marriages/deaths): 1728-1897 (parish B)

See also
 List of municipalities and towns in Slovakia

External links
 
https://web.archive.org/web/20071116010355/http://www.statistics.sk/mosmis/eng/run.html
http://www.e-obce.sk/obec/batorova/batorova.html
Surnames of living people in Batorova

Villages and municipalities in Veľký Krtíš District